Poromyoidea is a superfamily of molluscs. It used to contain only the family Poromyidae, but now it also contains Cetoconchidae , as Cetoconcha  was removed from Poromyidae and given its own family, according to the World Register of Marine Species.

Families and genera
Members of Poromyoidea are:
 Cetoconchidae 
 Cetoconcha 
 Poromyidae
Cetomya 
 Dermatomya 
 Dilemma 
 †Liopistha 
 Lissomya 
 Poromya

References

External links

Mollusc superfamilies
Anomalodesmata